William Adyes or Addis (by 1520 – 1558 or 1559), of Worcester, was an English politician.

Career
He was born by 1520 in the family of John Adyes and Joan. He married Ellen by 1541 and had two sons and one daughter. He held the office of clerk of the audit, Worcester by 1551-death (?).

William Adyes was a Member of Parliament for Worcester in 1555.

References

Year of birth missing
1550s deaths
16th-century births
English MPs 1555
Members of the Parliament of England for Worcester